Pish Osta (also Romanized as Pīsh Ostā; also known as Kūh-e Pīshostā, Pīshāsīāb, Pīsh Asīāb, Pīsh Āsyāb, Pīsh Ostād, Sar Āsīāb, Sar-e Āsīāb, and Sar-i-Āsīāb) is a village in Pa Qaleh Rural District, in the Central District of Shahr-e Babak County, Kerman Province, Iran. At the 2006 census, its population was 113, in 36 families.

References 

Populated places in Shahr-e Babak County